Ambalavao District is a district in central Madagascar. It covers an area of 4,798.47 km2, and had a population estimated at 209,417 in 2013. It is part of Haute Matsiatra Region. Its capital is Ambalavao.

Communes
The district is further divided into 17 communes:

 Ambalavao
 Ambinanindovoka
 Ambinanindroa
 Ambohimahamasina
 Ambohimandroso
 Andrainjato
 Anjoma
 Ankaramena
 Besoa
 Fenoarivo
 Iarintsena
 Kirano
 Mahazony
 Manamisoa
 Miarinarivo
 Sendrisoa
 Vohitsaoka

References

Districts of Haute Matsiatra